Naive is Micky & the Motorcars' fourth album. It was released on July 29, 2008. It was produced by David Abeyta and Cody Braun of Reckless Kelly. Songwriting credits include Willy Braun, Randy Rogers, and Kevin Welch among others.

Track listing
"Naive" (Micky Braun, Willy Braun) - 2:50
"Amber" (M. Braun, Savannah Welch) - 2:49
"Long Enough To Leave" (M. Braun, Randy Rogers) - 4:26
"Grow Old" (M. Braun) - 3:10
"Don't Be Sad" (M. Braun, W. Braun, Kevin Welch) - 3:13
"Misunderstood" (M. Braun, Robert Kearns) - 3:03
"Bloodshot" (M. Braun, Dustin Welch, James Harrison) - 3:23
"Seashell" (M. Braun, D. Welch) - 2:40
"Everything I've Got" (M. Braun, S. Welch, K. Welch) - 3:43
"Twilight" (John Dee Graham) - 3:43
"Seeds" (M. Braun) - 4:15
"Let's Split Out Of Here" (M. Braun, W. Braun) - 3:46

Personnel
Micky Braun - Lead Vocals, Acoustic Guitar, Electric Rhythm Guitar
Gary Braun - Electric Guitar, Harmonica, Lead and Harmony Vocals
Shane Vannerson - Drums, Percussion
Mark McCoy - Bass Guitar
Kris Farrow - Lead Guitar, Rickenbacker Mandoblaster
Bukka Allen - B3 Organ, Piano, Organ
Michael Ramos - Pump Organ
Lloyd Maines - Pedal Steel
Cody Braun - Background Vocals
David Abeyta - Piano, 12-String Electric Guitar
Mickey Raphael - Harmonica

Chart performance

References

Micky & the Motorcars albums
2008 albums